The fourth season of American Ninja Warrior began on May 20, 2012, and aired on NBC and G4.  This was a landmark season for Ninja Warrior, as the entire format was overhauled. For the first time, the finals took place on U.S. soil. In addition, regional qualifying and finals were added, taking place in Dallas, TX, Miami, FL, and the series' flagship location, Venice Beach, CA. New co-host Jonny Moseley replaced Jimmy Smith, while Angela Sun replaced Alison Haislip. Again, the winner would have received $500,000 and the coveted American Ninja Warrior title. Brent Steffensen became the first competitor to complete the Ultimate Cliffhanger.

Changes
Mount Midoriyama was moved from Japan to Las Vegas, Nevada for the national finals.

Regions
Instead of just one region, there were six regions: Southwest, Midwest, Northeast, Northwest, Midsouth, Southeast.

Obstacles

Regional Qualifying & Finals

National Finals

Regional Qualifying

Submission videos for American Ninja Warrior Season 4 had been collected since January 25, 2012.  There were six regional competitions held in three locations: Venice Beach, CA (Southwest and Northwest), Dallas, TX (Midwest and Midsouth), and Miami, FL (Northeast and Southeast) that determined the 100 competitors to participate in the qualifying rounds. The top 30 competitors that went the farthest the fastest would move on to the finals rounds.

Southwest Regional Qualifying

Midwest Regional Qualifying

Northeast Regional Qualifying

Northwest Regional Qualifying

Midsouth Regional Qualifying

Southeast Regional Qualifying

Venice Beach Qualifying Leaderboard

Dallas Qualifying Leaderboard

Miami Qualifying Leaderboard

Regional Qualifying Leaderboard

Regional Finals
The 30 competitors from qualifying in each region tackled an extended course, featuring three new additional obstacles like the Salmon Ladder and Cargo Climb. The top 15 competitors that went the farthest the fastest would move on to the national finals in Las Vegas.

Southwest Regional Finals

Midwest Regional Finals

Northeast Regional Finals

Northwest Regional Finals

Midsouth Regional Finals

Southeast Regional Finals

Venice Beach Finals Leaderboard

Dallas Finals Leaderboard

Miami Finals Leaderboard

Regional Finals Leaderboard

Notable competitors
Professional Parkour Athlete and Freerunner Brian Orosco
British film actor William Moseley
Tennessee Titans defensive end Kamerion Wimbley
 Stuntman Dan Mast
 Stuntwoman Luci Romberg
"Roam" (a.k.a. A.J. Amores) and "Chairman Platinum" from MMO video game company Artix Entertainment
Harlem Globetrotters basketball player Bull Bullard
Devin Thorpe aka Grim Leaper from Fly or Die Freerunning
Survivor China Contestant Michael "Frosti" Zernow

Mount Midoriyama

Legend
 The competitor cleared that stage. The competitor is female. The competitor ran out of time on the obstacle.

For the first time in the history of the series, rather than traveling to Japan to compete on Sasuke, 100 finalists from the regional qualifying and finals competed in the National Finals at Mount Midoriyama that was built just off the Las Vegas Strip.

Stage 1

Leaderboard

Stage 2

Leaderboard

Stage 3

Ratings

References

American Ninja Warrior
2012 American television seasons